Naarden is a city and former municipality in the Gooi region in the province of North Holland, Netherlands. It has been part of the new municipality of Gooise Meren since 2016.

History

Naarden was granted its city rights in 1300 (the only town in the Gooi with these rights) and later developed into a fortified garrison town with a textile industry. 

In 1572, the city was sacked and burnt down, and only 60 people survived the Massacre of Naarden. The massacre was committed by Spanish soldiers against the townspeople of Naarden as part of a punitive expedition against Dutch rebels later known as the Spanish Fury. The destruction of the city galvanized the Dutch rebels, leading them to continue the Dutch War of Independence against Spain.

Naarden is an example of a star fort, complete with fortified walls and a moat. The moat and walls have been restored on numerous occasions, most notably during the French era (1795-1814). After the Battle of Leipzig (1813), the Netherlands were liberated by an allied force of Dutch, Prussian and Russian armies. During this period, Naarden was besieged for months since the French commander didn't believe that Napoleon was captured. In May 1814, the French soldiers left the city in a retreat with honour (see Siege of Naarden (1813-1814).

John Amos Comenius, 17th century Moravian born Czech educator was buried in the city, and his mausoleum is open for visitors.

Despite its earlier importance, Naarden's population was surpassed by Hilversum in the 18th century and today it is smaller than its neighbour Bussum.

The city's distinctive shape made it a rallying point for Allied bombers returning to England after raids on Germany. 

Naarden was a separate municipality until 2015. On 1 January 2016, the municipality of Naarden merged with Muiden and Bussum to form the new municipality of Gooise Meren.

Economy
The company Stork B.V. had its head office in Naarden.

Geography

The city of Naarden is located in the municipality of Gooise Meren in the west of the Netherlands. It is situated in the Gooi region in the southeast of the province of North Holland.

Attractions

Naarden is the home of the Dutch Fortress Museum (Nederlands Vestingmuseum). Naarden hosts the bi-annual Naarden Photo Festival and, on Good Friday, a performance of Bach's St. Matthew Passion in the local church, which is called the Great Church or St. Vitus Church.

The Great Church (Grote Kerk) in Marktstraat dates from the 15th century. Prior to the Protestant Reformation it was named for St. Vitus. It is one of the oldest surviving churches in The Netherlands, having had the good fortune to survive the Spanish invasion of 1572 and the subsequent burning of the town. The church has numerous wooden vaults that are painted with scenes from the Old and New Testaments. These were hidden for many years and were only rediscovered in a recent restoration. The church is the venue for a number of cultural activities such as organ music nights and the bi-annual Naarden Photo festival.

The Spanish House (Spaanse Huis), situated at Turfpoortstraat 27, was originally a church building converted to house migrants. In 1572 Spanish troops conducted a massacre of some 700 inhabitants who had gathered to hear a peace proposal. The Spanish then fired on the assembled citizens, and went on to set fire to the town. A plaque above the lintel of the door and below the eaves commemorates the massacre.  In 1615, after the population had reestablished itself, they built the city hall on the site. Part of the building was given over to De Waag (The Scales House), the municipal office entrusted with the verification of weights and measures. The building later served a French garrison as a bakery, turning out over 1000 loaves per day. From 1967 until 1992 it served as the Comenius museum. Today, the historic building serves as the Weegschaal Museum.

Naarden is also the place where John Amos Comenius is buried in a mausoleum on Klooster straat. 
This place receives many visitors from Czechia, where he was born. Comenius is known as the inventor of our school system with grades and different classes.

Transport
The nearest station is Naarden-Bussum railway station, which has services to Almere, Amersfoort, Amsterdam and Utrecht.

Notable residents

 Nordin Amrabat (born 1987), football player
 Willem Arondeus (1894–1943), professional artist, author and Dutch Resistance member
 Tom Coronel (born 1972), racing driver
 Maarten de Bruijn (born 1965), product designer
 Annemarie Groen (born 1955), backstroke swimmer
 Egbert Haverkamp-Begemann (born 1923), art historian
 Tom van 't Hek (born 1958), field hockey player and coach
 Frank Martin (1890–1974), Swiss composer who lived in Naarden from 1954 
 Bertil Schmüll (born 1946), engraver
 Salomon van Ruysdael (~1602–1670), painter
 Jacob Spiers (born 1987), anthropologist and professional jump rope athlete

See also

Naarderbos
Spanish Empire

References

External links 

 Official website
 A view on the old city of Naarden

Geography of Gooise Meren
Former municipalities of North Holland
Populated places in North Holland
Municipalities of the Netherlands disestablished in 2016
Cities in the Netherlands
Fortifications in the Netherlands
Fortified settlements
Star forts
1300 establishments in Europe